Hocking House is a historic home in Frostburg, Allegany County, Maryland, United States. It is a -story, three-bay, hip-roofed dwelling, built about 1855 in the transitional Greek Revival-Italianate architecture style. The land on which the home stands was part of the estate of Robert Clarke, Sr., one of the original settlers of the area that is now Frostburg. It was converted into a clubhouse in 1942.

Hocking House was listed on the National Register of Historic Places in 1982.

References

External links
, including undated photo, at Maryland Historical Trust

Houses on the National Register of Historic Places in Maryland
Houses in Allegany County, Maryland
Houses completed in 1855
Greek Revival houses in Maryland
Italianate architecture in Maryland
Houses on the Underground Railroad
National Register of Historic Places in Allegany County, Maryland